Lee Kwang-jong (1 April 1964 – 26 September 2016) was a South Korean football player and coach.

He was manager of the South Korea national under-20 football team. He recorded Round of 16 of 2011 FIFA U-20 World Cup and Quarter-final of 2013 FIFA U-20 World Cup.

Lee had been coaching football since 2000.

Honors

Player

Club
Yukong Kokkiri
K League 1 (1) : 1989
League Cup (1) : 1994

Manager

International
South Korea U19
AFC Youth Championship (1) : 2012
South Korea U23
 Asian Games Gold medal (1) : 2014

References 
 

1964 births
2016 deaths
Association football midfielders
South Korean footballers
Jeju United FC players
Suwon Samsung Bluewings players
K League 1 players